Blanca Batista Santiago, known as Nyasia (born in West Palm Beach, Florida, United States) is an American singer of Freestyle music and dance-pop. Nyasia is best remembered for her single "Who's Got Your Love", which reached No. 95 position on  Billboard Hot 100.

Discography

Singles
 1991: "Now and Forever"
 1992: "Who's Got Your Love"
 1992: "I'm the One"
 1993: "Midnight Passion"
 1993: "Do not Waste My Time"
 1994: "Take Me Away"
 1995: "Two Time Lover"
 1996: "I Feel the Way U Do"
 2009: "Beytray"
 2011: "99 & 1/2"

References

External links
Nyasia @ Discogs.com

American dance musicians
American freestyle musicians
American women pop singers
Living people
Year of birth missing (living people)